Pycnocycla is a genus of flowering plants belonging to the family Apiaceae.

Its native range is Western Tropical Africa to India.

Species:

Pycnocycla acanthorhipsis 
Pycnocycla aucheriana 
Pycnocycla bashagardiana 
Pycnocycla cephalantha 
Pycnocycla cespitosa 
Pycnocycla flabellifolia 
Pycnocycla glauca 
Pycnocycla ledermannii 
Pycnocycla musiformis 
Pycnocycla nodiflora 
Pycnocycla prostrata 
Pycnocycla saxatilis 
Pycnocycla sheilae 
Pycnocycla spinosa 
Pycnocycla tomentosa

References

Apioideae
Apioideae genera